Boris Flamík (born June 27, 1980) is a Slovak former ice hockey defenceman.

Flamík played 304 games in the Slovak Extraliga, playing for HK 36 Skalica and MHC Martin. He also played one game in the Czech Extraliga for BK Mladá Boleslav during the 2008–09 season.

Career statistics

References

External links

1980 births
Living people
ETC Crimmitschau players
SHK Hodonín players
Stadion Hradec Králové players
Lausitzer Füchse players
MHC Martin players
BK Mladá Boleslav players
Sportspeople from Skalica
HK 91 Senica players
HK 36 Skalica players
SK Horácká Slavia Třebíč players
Slovak ice hockey defencemen
1. EV Weiden players
Slovak expatriate ice hockey players in the Czech Republic
Slovak expatriate ice hockey players in Germany